Exploits Valley High is a high school located at 392 Grenfell Heights in Grand Falls-Windsor, Newfoundland and Labrador, Canada. The administrators of the school are Paul Lewis (principal) and Glenn Casey (vice-principal). The school operates under the Newfoundland and Labrador English School District. The school has roughly 35 faculty members and 500 students.

Sports and recreation

Sports the school currently has teams that include:
Ice Hockey: winners of the 2011 & 2012 Newfoundland and Labrador Provincial High School Hockey Championship.
Volleyball
Basketball
Softball
Soccer

The school hosts many other programs including
School Jazz Band
School Band
Choir
Musical Theatre
School Leadership
LGBTQ club
Tech Club
Photo Club/Photography Club
Poetry Club
Yearbook Committee
Art Club

Use of building
Exploits Valley High, Grades 10-12 (2005–present)
Grenfell Intermediate, Grades 7-8 (1999–2005)
Bursey Memorial Collegiate (before 1999)

Student awards
2015, Lester B. Pearson Scholarship, Kirsten Dalley
2014, Most Outstanding Student Award, Gregory Fewer
2012, Miss teen NL, Emily Bland
2011, Miss NL, Mandi Gale
2008, Miss teen NL, Laura Woodworth
2008, Composers award for Mr. Michael Snelgrove (music)

External links
 Exploits Valley High

High schools in Newfoundland and Labrador
Grand Falls-Windsor
Educational institutions in Canada with year of establishment missing